Sweetbitter is an American drama television series, based on the 2016 novel of the same name by Stephanie Danler and inspired by her time working in New York’s well-known restaurant Union Square Café. The show premiered on May 6, 2018 on Starz. In July 2018, it was announced that Starz had renewed the series for a second season which premiered on July 14, 2019. In December 2019, the series was canceled after two seasons.

Premise
Sweetbitter follows Tess, who shortly after arriving in New York City, lands a job at a celebrated downtown restaurant. Swiftly introduced to the world of drugs, drinking, love, lust, dive bars and fine dining, she learns to navigate the chaotically alluring, yet punishing life she has stumbled upon."

Cast and characters

Main
 Ella Purnell as Tess
 Tom Sturridge as Jake
 Caitlin FitzGerald as Simone
 Evan Jonigkeit as Will
 Eden Epstein as Ariel ‘Ari’
 Jasmine Mathews as Heather
 Daniyar as Sasha
 Paul Sparks as Howard

Recurring
 Jimmie Saito as Scott
 Katerina Tannenbaum as Becky
 Rafa Beato as Santos

Guest
 Sandra Bernhard as Maddie Glover

Episodes

Season 1 (2018)

Season 2 (2019)

Production

Development
In July 2017, it was reported that Starz was developing a television adaptation of Stephanie Danler's novel Sweetbitter and considering ordering it to series. The project was based on a pilot script developed by Danler and Stu Zicherman, written by Danler, and produced by Plan B Entertainment. Starz ordered additional scripts and assembled a small writers room with an eye toward a potential straight-to-series order. Starz president and CEO Chris Albrecht said at the time, "It’s a book that several of the women at Starz had read and were excited about. When we heard it may be a project, I literally had some of my colleagues come and say this is one we’ve got to get; it plays into young female demographic but as we know women of all ages will certainly be attracted to great stories."

In October 2017, Starz officially ordered the show to series for a first season consisting of six half-hour episodes. It was also announced that Richard Shepard, had come on board to direct and executive produce, Donna Bloom would serve as producer on series, and that Laura Rosenthal was leading the ongoing casting search.

In January 2018, it was announced at the annual Television Critics Association winter press tour that the series would premiere on May 6, 2018. On July 13, 2018, it was reported that Starz had renewed the series for a second season in which is set to premiere on July 14, 2019. On December 20, 2019, Starz canceled the series after two seasons.

Casting
On October 6, 2017, two days after the show was ordered to series, it was announced that Ella Purnell had been cast in the series lead role as Tess. Later that month, the rest of the main cast was announced. These included Tom Sturridge, Caitlin FitzGerald, Paul Sparks, Evan Jonigkeit, Daniyar, Eden Epstein, and Jasmine Mathews. On January 17, 2018, it was announced that Jimmie Saito had been cast in a recurring role as Scott, "the restaurant’s handsome, strong-minded sous chef". On October 24, 2018, it was reported that Sandra Bernhard had been cast in a guest starring role for season two.

Filming
Principal photography for the first season lasted from October to December 2017 in New York City, New York.

Release

Marketing
On March 1, 2018, Starz released the first poster and trailer for the series.

On March 10, 2018, Starz opened the "Starz Sensory House" at the annual South by Southwest Film Festival in Austin, Texas. It featured a multitude of screens playing the trailers for two new Starz series, Vida and Sweetbitter, on a loop. Various types of food and drinks were available and designed thematically to match. For Sweetbitter, Sugarfina handed out a selection of alcohol-inspired sweets, including martini almond olives and champagne gummy bears. Additionally, a series of six artisanal cocktails were also available, designed by Austin-based bartender Tacy Rowland. One such cocktail based on Sweetbitter included the "Autumn in New York", featuring cognac, sherry, coffee, bitter lemon and a rosemary garnish. Other services contained in the sensory house included mini manicures that were offered by the Austin-based Nails Y’all, and a perfume bar Roux Saint James, which created four custom scents inspired by Sweetbitter’s four main characters. The Starz Sensory House was located at 88 Rainey Street in Austin and operated until March 12.

Premiere
On April 26, 2018, the series held its world premiere at the SVA Theatre in New York City, New York during the annual Tribeca Film Festival. Following the screening a discussion was held with creator, executive producer, and writer Stephanie Danler, showrunner Stuart Zicherman, and cast members Ella Purnell, Caitlin FitzGerald, Tom Sturridge, and Paul Sparks.

Reception
The first season has been met with a mixed to negative response from critics. On the review aggregation website Rotten Tomatoes, the first season holds a 30% approval rating with an average rating of 5.25 out of 10 based on 23 reviews. The website's critical consensus reads, "Sweetbitter fails to live up to its well-received literary source material -- or stand out from the many big-city coming-of-age television series that came before it." Metacritic, which uses a weighted average, assigned the season a score of 52 out of 100 based on 14 critics, indicating "mixed or average reviews".

References

External links
 
 

2010s American workplace drama television series
2018 American television series debuts
2019 American television series endings
English-language television shows
Starz original programming
Television shows based on American novels
Television series set in 2006
Television series set in restaurants
Television shows filmed in New York City
Television shows set in New York City